Andrew Darren Scott (born 19 June 2000) is a Northern Irish professional footballer who plays as a winger for NIFL Premiership side Coleraine.

Early and personal life
Scott is from Castlederg, and was born in the town.

Club career
After playing for the Maiden City Soccer Academy in Derry, he signed a three-year contract with English club Accrington Stanley in August 2018 following a trial.

In December 2018 he joined Stalybridge Celtic on loan for a month.  He scored on his debut for the club on 8 December 2018. On 19 January 2019, he was loaned out to the club again.

In December 2019 he joined Curzon Ashton on loan for a month. 

In February 2020 he joined Radcliffe on loan.

In June 2020 it was announced he would leave Accrington on 30 June when his contract expired.

In August 2020 he signed for Larne. In January 2023 he moved to Coleraine.

International career
Scott has been capped for Northern Ireland at under-17 youth level.

Honours
Larne
County Antrim Shield: (2) 2020–21, 2021-22

References

2000 births
Living people
Association footballers from Northern Ireland
Accrington Stanley F.C. players
Association football wingers
Expatriate association footballers from Northern Ireland
Expatriate footballers in England
Northern Ireland youth international footballers
Stalybridge Celtic F.C. players
Curzon Ashton F.C. players
Radcliffe F.C. players
Larne F.C. players
Coleraine F.C. players
National League (English football) players
NIFL Premiership players